Armley Moor railway station was a station on the former Great Northern Railway between Leeds and Bramley. The location was between Carr Crofts and Wortley Road bridges, accessed via Station Road.

It served the Leeds suburb of Armley in West Yorkshire, England until closure in July 1966 due to the Beeching Axe. The station was immortalised in 1964 in the song "Slow Train" by Flanders and Swann.

History

Opened by the Leeds, Bradford and Halifax Junction Railway, then absorbed by the Great Northern Railway, it became part of the London and North Eastern Railway during the Grouping of 1923. The station then passed on to the Eastern Region of British Railways on nationalisation in 1948 and was then closed by the British Railways Board.

The site today

Trains still pass the site on what is now known as the Caldervale Line, but all of the structures (platforms & buildings) have been demolished.

References 

 
 
 Disused stations

External links
 Armley Moor station on navigable 1947 O. S. map

Disused railway stations in Leeds
Armley
Beeching closures in England
Railway stations in Great Britain opened in 1854
Railway stations in Great Britain closed in 1966
1854 establishments in England
Former Great Northern Railway stations